The 2016 Regional League Division 2 (also known as the AIS League Division 2 for sponsorship reasons) was the 11th season of the Regional League Division 2, it had redirected from the division 2, since its establishment in 2006. The 94 clubs will be divided into 8 groups (regions).

2016 Regional League stage table All locations

2016

Red Zone : 2016 Regional League Division 2 Bangkok Metropolitan Region
Cyan Zone : 2016 Regional League Division 2 Bangkok & Eastern Region
Purple Zone: 2016 Regional League Division 2 Central Region
Yellow Zone : 2016 Regional League Division 2 Eastern Region
Pink Zone: 2016 Regional League Division 2 Western Region
Green Zone: 2016 Regional League Division 2 Northern Region
  Orange Zone: 2016 Regional League Division 2 North Eastern Region
Blue Zone: 2016 Regional League Division 2 Southern Region

List of Qualified Teams
Bangkok & field (2)
  Chamchuri United  (Winner)
  Kasetsart  (Runner-up)

Bangkok & Eastern (2)
   Rajpracha (Winner)
   MOF Customs United (Runner-up)

Central (2)
   Ayutthaya Warrior (Winner)
   Ayutthaya (Runner-up)

Eastern (2)
   Trat (Winner)
   Chachoengsao Hi-Tek (Runner-up)

Western (2)
   Samut Sakhon (Winner)
   Krung Thonburi (Runner-up)

Northern (2)
  Nongbua Pitchaya (Winner)
  Kamphaengphet (Runner-up)

North Eastern (2)
   Udon Thani (Winner)
   Ubon Ratchathani (Runner-up)

Southern (2)
   Surat Thani (Winner)
   Nara United (Runner-up)

Champions League Knockout stage

Stadium and locations

Bracket

Round of 16

|-
!colspan=5|Line A

|-
!colspan=5|Line B

|}

Line A

Samut Sakhon won 5–0 on aggregate.

Trat won 4–1 on aggregate.

Nongbua Pitchaya won 3–2 on aggregate.

Udon Thani won 3–0 on aggregate.

Line B

Kasetsart won 3–2 on aggregate.

1–1 on aggregate. Rajpracha won 5–4 on penalties.

2–2 on aggregate. Kamphaengphet won on away goals.

Surat Thani won 2–0 on aggregate.

Quarter-finals

|-
!colspan=5|Line A

|-
!colspan=5|Line B

|}

Line A

Trat won 2–1 on aggregate.

4–4 on aggregate. Nongbua Pitchaya won on away goals.

Line B

Kasetsart won 1–0 on aggregate.

Surat Thani won 5–3 on aggregate.

Final
Following the death of King Bhumibol Adulyadej, the Football Association of Thailand cancelled the remaining league season on 14 October 2016. Last 4 teams of the 2016 Regional League Division 2 Champions League round had drawn to ranked for promoted to the 2017 Thai League Division 1. They had ranked on October 20, 2016.
 Trat
 Nongbua Pitchaya
 Kasetsart
 Surat Thani

Results

See also
 2016 Thai League
 2016 Thai Division 1 League
 2016 Football Division 3
 2016 Thai FA Cup
 2016 Thai League Cup
 2016 Kor Royal Cup

References

 Official draw and fixtures
 Kasetsart F.C. Club data form League Division 2 offocial website
 Chachoengsao Hi-Tek F.C. Club data form League Division 2 offocial website
 Official website of Hi-Tek Electronic that the main sponsor of Chachoengsao Hi-Tek
 Pattern from 2016 AFC Champions League knockout stage
  
  
  
  

Thai League T4 seasons
3